Patrick Tuara (born 23 March 1993) is a male sprinter from the Cook Islands who represented his country at the 2012 Summer Olympics in London. Participating in the men's 100 metre sprint, he finished eighth in the fourth preliminary heat with a personal best time of 11.72 seconds.

References

External links
 
 Team Cook Islands at the London Olympics 2012
 BBC Sport - London 2012 Olympics - Patrick Tuara : Cook Islands, Athletics

1993 births
Living people
Athletes (track and field) at the 2012 Summer Olympics
Cook Island male sprinters
Olympic athletes of the Cook Islands